Ricardo Sousa Malafaia Fernandes (born 11 August 1981 in Maia, Porto District), known as Malafaia, is a Portuguese retired footballer who played as an attacking midfielder, and is the manager of Leixões SC's under-19 team.

References

External links

1981 births
Living people
People from Maia, Portugal
Portuguese footballers
Association football midfielders
Liga Portugal 2 players
Segunda Divisão players
F.C. Maia players
Leixões S.C. players
Varzim S.C. players
Gondomar S.C. players
Boavista F.C. players
C.D. Santa Clara players
Segunda División B players
Racing de Ferrol footballers
Portuguese expatriate footballers
Expatriate footballers in Spain
Portuguese expatriate sportspeople in Spain
Portuguese football managers
Liga Portugal 2 managers
Leixões S.C. managers
Sportspeople from Porto District